Chernobyl liquidators were the civil and military personnel who were called upon to deal with the consequences of the 1986 Chernobyl nuclear disaster in the Soviet Union on the site of the event. The liquidators are widely credited with limiting both the immediate and long-term damage from the disaster.

Surviving liquidators are qualified for significant social benefits due to their veteran status. Many liquidators were praised as heroes by the Soviet Government and the press, while some struggled for years to have their participation officially recognized.

Name 

The colloquial term "liquidator" (likvidator) originates from the Soviet official definition "участник ликвидации последствий аварии на Чернобыльской АЭС" (uchastnik likvidatsii posledstviy avarii na Chernobylʹskoy AES, literally "participant in liquidation of the Chernobyl NPP accident consequences") which was widely used to describe the liquidators' activities regarding their employment, healthcare, and retirement. This exact phrase is engraved on the Soviet medals and badges awarded to the liquidators.

Roles 

Disaster management at Chernobyl included a diverse range of occupations, positions, and tasks, and in particular:
 Operational personnel of the Chernobyl nuclear power plant
 Firefighters who immediately responded to the reactor accident
 Civil defense troops of the Soviet Armed Forces who removed contaminated materials and the deactivation on the reactor and all affected territories
 Internal Troops and police who provided security, access control and population evacuation
 Military and civil medical and sanitation personnel, including:
Groups of female janitors tasked with the cleanup of food left inside abandoned homes to prevent outbreaks of infectious diseases
Special hunting squads assigned to exterminate domestic animals left in evacuated settlements
 Soviet Air Force and civil aviation units who fulfilled critical helicopter-assisted operations on the reactor building, air transportation and aerial radioactive contamination monitoring, including Mykola Melnyk, a civilian helicopter pilot who placed radiation sensors on the reactor
 Various civilian scientists, engineers, and workers involved in all stages of disaster management:
 Transportation workers
 A team of coal miners who built a large protective foundation to prevent radioactive material from entering the aquifer below the reactor
 Construction professionals
 Media professionals who risked their lives to document the disaster on the ground, including photographers Igor Kostin and Volodymyr Shevchenko, who are credited with taking the most immediate and graphic pictures of the destroyed reactor, and liquidators conducting hazardous manual tasks

A small number of foreigners (mostly from the Western countries) volunteered to participate in international medicine- and science-related on-the-ground projects related to the relief operation. Technically, they may also qualify for liquidator status depending on their exact location and tasks at the time of participation.

Health effects 

According to the WHO, 240,000 recovery workers were called upon in 1986 and 1987 alone. Altogether, special certificates were issued for 600,000 people recognizing them as liquidators.

Total recorded doses to individual workers in Chernobyl recovery operations during the period through 1990 ranged from less than 10 millisieverts (less than 1 rem) to more than 1 sievert (100 rems), due primarily to external radiation. The average dose is estimated to have been 120 millisieverts (12 rem) and 85% of the recorded doses were between 20 and 500 millisieverts (2 to 50 rems). There are large uncertainties in these individual doses; estimates of the size of the uncertainty range from 50% to a factor of five and dose records for military personnel are thought to be biased toward high values. The United Nations Scientific Committee on the Effects of Atomic Radiation (UNSCEAR) estimates the total collective dose to the total of about 530,000 recovery operations workers as about 60,000 person-sieverts (6,000,000 person-rem).

According to Vyacheslav Grishin of the Chernobyl Union, the main organization of liquidators, "25,000 of the Russian liquidators are dead and 70,000 disabled, about the same in Ukraine, and 10,000 dead in Belarus and 25,000 disabled", which makes a total of 60,000 dead (10% of the 600,000 liquidators) and 165,000 disabled. Estimates of the number of deaths potentially resulting from the accident vary enormously: the World Health Organization (WHO) suggest it could reach 4,000:

Ivanov et al. (2001) studied nearly 66,000 liquidators from Russia, and found no increase in overall mortality from cancer or non-cancer causes. However, a statistically significant dose-related excess mortality risk was found for both cancer and heart disease.

Rahu et al. (2006) studied some 10,000 liquidators from Latvia and Estonia and found no significant increase in overall cancer rate. Among specific cancer types, statistically significant increases in both thyroid and brain cancer were found, although the authors believe these may have been the result of better cancer screening among liquidators (for thyroid cancer) or a random result (for brain cancer) because of the very low overall incidence.

While there is rough agreement that a total of either 31 or 54 people died from blast trauma or acute radiation syndrome (ARS) as a direct result of the disaster, there is considerable debate concerning the accurate number of deaths due to the disaster's long-term health effects, with estimates ranging from 4,000 (per the 2005 and 2006 conclusions of a joint consortium of the United Nations and the governments of Ukraine, Belarus, and Russia), to no fewer than 93,000 (per the conflicting conclusions of various scientific, health, environmental, and survivors' organizations).

Legacy 

The 20th anniversary of the Chernobyl catastrophe in 2006 was marked by a series of events and developments.

The liquidators held a rally in Kyiv to complain about deteriorated compensation and medical support. Similar rallies were held in many other cities of the former Soviet Union.

More than 4,500 Estonian residents were sent to help in the liquidation. The liquidators who reside in Estonia (some 4,200 as reported in 2006, 3,140 as of 2011) campaigned hope for the introduction of an Estonian law for their relief. Under Estonian law, the state was only obliged to provide help and relief only to citizens, who are "legal descendants" of the citizens of 1918–1940 Republic of Estonia. At the same time, Russia, Belarus and Ukraine do not provide any relief to the liquidators residing abroad. The problem is tied to the fact that Chernobyl veterans are classified under the Estonian Persons Repressed by Occupying Powers Act. It was reported in 2017 that an agreement had been reached by the Estonian parliament to provide all liquidators residing in Estonia, including over 1,400 non citizens, with a payment of €230 per year.

The most highly exposed clean-up workers were significantly more symptomatic on the somatization and posttraumatic stress disorder (PTSD) symptom scales. The workers with the greatest exposure reported more impairment than the two less-exposed groups, especially on the PTSD measures. Consistent with the findings of The Chernobyl Forum (2006) and with findings from other disasters involving radiation, the results show that the accident had a deleterious effect on mental health.

A number of military liquidators residing in Khabarovsk (Russia) were denied a certain compensation for loss of health on grounds that they were not salaried workers, but rather under military order. They had to appeal to the European Court of Human Rights. On 29 December 2004 and 21 March 2006 the Russian government adopted ECHR Rulings, according to which accommodation for Chernobyl victims and servicemen, including former servicemen, shall be granted either financial aid or state housing. However an interim ECHR Resolution in 2009 CM/ResDH(2009)43 indicated that the Russian government was failing to implement the policies

Public record 
The National Chernobyl Museum in Kyiv, Ukraine keeps a "Remembrance Book" (Kneeha Pahmyati)  an open to the public online database of liquidators featuring personal pages with photo and brief structured information on their input. Data fields include "Radiation damage suffered", "Field of liquidation activity" and "Subsequent fate". The project started in 1997, containing over 5,000 entries as of February, 2013. The database is currently available in the Ukrainian language only.

See also 
 Chernobyl: Abyss, a 2021 Russian film about a fictionalized liquidator
 Fukushima 50, a similar group of workers from the 2011 nuclear disaster in Japan
 Hibakusha, Japanese terms for a person who has been irradiated by a nuclear bomb
 Nuclear labor issues
 List of Chernobyl-related articles

References

External links 

 Pictures: "Liquidators" Endured Chernobyl 25 Years Ago -  annotated set of Liquidators photos by Igor Kostin in National Geographic
 A Worker Recalls the Chernobyl Disaster 2006 article by The Washington Post

 
Radiation health effects